The Brewster Apartments (originally known as Lincoln Park Palace) is a residential building in the Lake View neighborhood of Chicago.

Located at Diversey and Pine Grove (originally Park), it was designed by architect Enock Hill Turnock for Norwegian-native Bjoerne Edwards, publisher of American Contractor, with construction started in 1893 and completed in 1896. Edwards would die from an eighth-floor fall at the construction site before the project was completed.

The Romanesque Revival building was designated a Chicago Landmark on October 6, 1982.

Architecture

The building features a pink Jasper granite exterior and employs skeleton-frame construction, which enabled the advent of skyscrapers at the end of the 19th century. Within the external masonry walls is an interior featuring open cast iron stairways, bridge walkways paved with glass blocks, and a massive skylight.

In popular culture
The Brewster Apartments has served as a set location for the movies Running Scared, Child’s Play and Hoodlum.

Notable residents
Illinois Governor John Peter Altgeld lived in the building in 1897 after leaving the governorship.

Charlie Chaplin lived in the building in 1915–16 while employed by Chicago’s Essanay Studios. He would later move to the studio’s Niles, CA location. The penthouse owners have sworn by this tale of early film history, though historians say that Chaplin only lived in Chicago for three weeks, and slept on “Broncho Billy” Anderson’s couch instead of getting himself an apartment — at the time, he was known for being far too tight with money to rent a place as pricey as the penthouse would have been.

See also
 List of Chicago Landmarks

References

Chicago Landmarks
Houses completed in 1896
Residential condominiums in Chicago